Forsyth may refer to:

Places

Oceania
 Forsyth Island, Queensland, Australia, one of the West Wellesley Islands (aka Forsyth Islands)
 Forsyth Island, Tasmania, Australia
 Forsyth Island (New Zealand), in the outer Marlborough Sounds of South Island
 Lake Forsyth, New Zealand
 Forsyth Bluff, Australia, see West Cape Howe National Park
 Forsyth Peak, in the Cruzen Range of Victoria Land

United States
 Forsyth, Georgia, a city
 Forsyth, Illinois, a village
 Forsyth, Missouri, a city
 Forsyth, Montana, a city
 Forsyth County, North Carolina
 Forsyth County, Georgia
 Forsyth Township, Michigan
 Forsyth Street, Manhattan, New York
 Forsyth Park, Savannah, Georgia
 James and Mary Forsyth House, listed on the National Register of Historic Places

People
 Forsyth (surname), a list of people with the surname Forsyth
 Forsyth (given name), a list of people with the given name Forsyth
 Clan Forsyth, a Scottish clan

Other
 The Forsyth Institute, an oral health research institute based in Boston, Massachusetts
 Forsyth Medical Center, Winston-Salem, North Carolina
 Forsyth Technical Community College, Winston-Salem, North Carolina
 USS Forsyth (PF-102), a United States Navy patrol frigate in commission from 1945 to 1946
 Forsyth (St. Louis MetroLink), a tram station

See also 
 Forsyte (disambiguation)
 Forsythe (disambiguation)
 Forsyth–Edwards Notation (FEN), in chess